Younous Oumouri (born 30 August 1975) is a Malagasy retired footballer who played as a centre back. Formerly, he played for Dender in Belgium and Apollon Kalamarias F.C. in Greece. He also played for FC Martigues (1998–99).

References

External links
 

1975 births
Living people
Association football defenders
People with acquired Malagasy citizenship
Malagasy footballers
Malagasy expatriate footballers
Madagascar international footballers
French footballers
French sportspeople of Malagasy descent
Olympique de Marseille players
FC Martigues players
F.C.V. Dender E.H. players
R.W.D. Molenbeek players
K.S.K. Ronse players
K.S.K. Beveren players
Apollon Pontou FC players
Egaleo F.C. players
Footballers from Réunion
People of Malagasy descent from Réunion
Expatriate footballers in France
Expatriate footballers in Belgium
Expatriate footballers in Greece
Malagasy expatriate sportspeople in France
Malagasy expatriate sportspeople in Belgium
Malagasy expatriate sportspeople in Greece